Ahmed Kamal is an Egyptian football defender who plays for Haras El Hodood.

He has been called up for Egypt for a friendly match against Guinea on August 12, 2009, he made his debut in this match he came from the bench for Sayed Moawad which was ended a 3–3 draw.

References

Living people
1981 births
Egyptian footballers
Egypt international footballers
Association football fullbacks